The Dark Triangle is a juvenile science fiction novel, the twentieth and last published in Hugh Walters' Chris Godfrey of U.N.E.X.A. series. It was published in the UK by Faber in 1979. One final book - The Glass Men - was written, but was never published.

A copy of the completed novel was sent to then serving prime minister Margaret Thatcher and president Ronald Reagan in 1982.

Plot summary

A plane carrying both the United Kingdom Prime Minister and United States President goes missing over the Bermuda Triangle.  Chris Godfrey and company investigate and are captured by strange creatures.

External links
The Dark Triangle page
Library thing catalogue
Collectors information
Worldcat entry

References

1979 British novels
1979 science fiction novels
Chris Godfrey of U.N.E.X.A. series
Faber and Faber books
1979 children's books